Birte Ove-Petersen was a Danish swimmer who won three medals at the 1938 European Aquatics Championships. She was part of the Danish team that won the 4×100 m freestyle relay, setting a new world record and breaking their own world record of the same year.

References

Danish female swimmers
European Aquatics Championships medalists in swimming